The CNR Spadina Roundhouse was owned by the Canadian National Railway, built in 1928 (by Anglin-Norcross of Montreal). The purpose of Spadina Roundhouse was the pretrip inspection, service and repairing of the motive power of passenger trains, including locomotives and Budd Rail Diesel Cars terminating, or originating at Toronto Union Station. 

Spadina Roundhouse was located in the rail yard, south of Front Street, on the east side of Spadina Avenue. Other facilities included a wheel shop, passenger car repair track and paint shop. A coach yard was located west of Spadina Avenue.

The Spadina Roundhouse and the Canadian Pacific Railway John Street Roundhouse, now the home of the Steam Whistle brewery, were two of hundreds of roundhouses in North America in the 1930s.
On October 31st 1970 the famous steam locomotive "Flying Scotsman" was stored in the roundhouse to wait out the winter.

The Spadina Roundhouse was demolished in 1986, and SkyDome, now Rogers Centre, was built in its place.

See also
 CPR John Street Roundhouse

Buildings and structures demolished in 1986
Canadian National Railway facilities in Ontario
Demolished buildings and structures in Toronto
Railway roundhouses in Toronto
Transport infrastructure completed in 1928
1928 establishments in Ontario
1986 disestablishments in Ontario